Edna Maison (born Carmen Edna Maisonave; August 17, 1892 – January 11, 1946) was an American silent film actress. 

Maison was born Carmen Edna Maisonave in San Francisco. Her father was a Frenchman and her mother was American. She was educated in Los Angeles at the Immaculate Heart Academy and her first job involved working with the Cooper Stock Company at the Burbank Theater in Los Angeles at the age of 6. Edna Maison's career started in Opera, singing at the Tivoli opera-house in San Francisco at age 15. Following, she went to Fisher's Theater, the California Opera Company, and lastly with the Edgar Temple Opera Company before moving into film work.  Maison was described as an earth mother type who loved animals.  

Maison starred in a total of 85 films between 1912 and 1926 in films such as The Idol of Bonanza Camp (1913) and Undine (1916) and appearing with actors such as Harry von Meter.

Partial filmography
 The Idol of Bonanza Camp (1913)
 The Proof of the Man (1913)
 The Spy (1914)
 The Merchant of Venice (1914)
 Richelieu (1914)
 Under the Crescent (1915)
 Undine (1916)
The Dumb Girl of Portici (1916)
 A Rich Man's Darling (1918)
 The Mysterious Mr. Browning (1918)

References

External links 

 

1892 births
1946 deaths
American film actresses
American silent film actresses
Actresses from San Francisco
20th-century American actresses